Muhiddin or Muhittin is a Turkish given name and surname, and is a variant of the Arabic name Muḥyī'd-Dīn. It may refer to:

Given name
Muhittin Akyüz (1870–1940), Turkish general, diplomat.
Muhittin Kurtiş (1876–1951), Turkish general.
Muhittin Serin (born 1945), calligrapher
Şerif Muhiddin Targan (1892–1967), Turkish musician
Muhittin Taylan (1910–1983), Turkish judge
Muhyiddin Yassin (born 1947), Malaysian former Prime Minister, politician

Surname
Nezihe Muhiddin (1889–1958), Ottoman and Turkish women's rights campaigner
Twahir Muhiddin, Kenyan football coach

Turkish-language surnames
Turkish masculine given names